"White Angel" is the 5th single by the Japanese girl idol group Fairies,  released in Japan on November 14, 2012 on the label Sonic Groove (a subsidiary of Avex Group).

The physical CD single debuted at number 5 in the Oricon weekly singles chart.

Release 
The single was released in several versions: CD+DVD, CD-only,  a limited live venue CD+photoalbum edition that was intended for sale only at concerts, and there were also limited-edition picture-labeled CDs that were available only in the Mu-mo online shop.

Track listing

CD+DVD edition

CD-only edition

Limited editions

Charts

Single

Awards 

|-
|rowspan="2"| 2012
|rowspan="2"| "White Angel"
| Japan Record Awards — Gold Award 
| 
|-
| Japan Record Awards — Grand Prix
| 
|-

References

External links 
 Discography on the official website of Fairies

2012 singles
Japanese-language songs
Fairies (Japanese group) songs
2012 songs
Avex Group singles
Song articles with missing songwriters